This is the results breakdown of the local elections held in the Community of Madrid on 24 May 2015. The following tables show detailed results in the autonomous community's most populous municipalities, sorted alphabetically.

Opinion polls

Overall

City control
The following table lists party control in the most populous municipalities, including provincial capitals (shown in bold). Gains for a party are displayed with the cell's background shaded in that party's colour.

Municipalities

Alcalá de Henares
Population: 200,768

Alcobendas
Population: 112,188

Alcorcón
Population: 170,336

Coslada
Population: 88,847

Fuenlabrada
Population: 195,864

Getafe
Population: 173,057

Leganés
Population: 186,696

Madrid

Population: 3,165,235

Móstoles
Population: 205,712

Parla
Population: 125,323

Torrejón de Ardoz
Population: 126,878

See also
2015 Madrilenian regional election

References

Madrid
2015